Umanamente uomo: il sogno (Humanly man: the dream) is an album by the Italian singer-songwriter Lucio Battisti. It was released in April 1972 by Numero Uno.

The album was Italy's second best-selling album in 1972.

Track listing 
All lyrics written by Mogol, all music composed by Lucio Battisti.
 "I giardini di marzo" (The March Gardens) – 5:33
 "Innocenti evasioni" (Innocent Evasions) – 3:48
 "E penso a te" (And I Think Of You) – 4:18
 "Umanamente uomo: il sogno" (Humanly Man: The Dream) – 3:24
 "Comunque bella" (Though Beautiful) – 3:53
 "Il leone e la gallina" (The Lion and the Hen) – 3:32
 "Sognando e risognando" (Dreaming and Dreaming Again) – 5:17
 "Il fuoco" (The Fire) – 4:10

References

1972 albums
Lucio Battisti albums